Trace amine-associated receptor 8 is a protein that in humans is encoded by the TAAR8 gene. In humans, TAAR8 is the only trace amine-associated receptor that is known to be Gi/o-coupled.

In humans, molecular modelling and docking experiments have shown that putrescine fits into the binding pocket of the human TAAR6 and TAAR8 receptors.

G protein-coupled receptors (GPCRs, or GPRs) contain 7 transmembrane domains and transduce extracellular signals through heterotrimeric G proteins.[supplied by OMIM]

See also 
 Trace amine-associated receptor

References

Further reading 

 

G protein-coupled receptors